Mauressac is a commune in the Haute-Garonne department in southwestern France.

Geography
The commune is bordered by four communes: Auterive to the northeast, Grazac to the southeast, Esperce to the southwest, and finally by Puydaniel to the northwest.

Population

See also
Communes of the Haute-Garonne department

References

Communes of Haute-Garonne